Ankyrin repeat and BTB/POZ domain-containing protein 1 is a protein that in humans is encoded by the ABTB1 gene.

Function 

This gene encodes a protein with an ankyrin repeat region and two BTB/POZ domains, which are thought to be involved in protein-protein interactions. Expression of this gene is activated by the phosphatase and tensin homolog, a tumor suppressor. Alternate splicing results in three transcript variants encoding different isoforms.

References

External links

Further reading